National Housing and Construction Company Limited (NHCC), is a Ugandan construction and real estate management company, partly owned by the Uganda Government. The Company’s mandate is to increase the housing stock in the country, rehabilitate the housing industry and encourage Ugandans to own homes in an organized environment.

History
NHCC was established by the National Housing Corporation Act of 1964, as a government parastatal. The Act was repealed by the 1974 Decree to form the National Housing and Construction Corporation. In July 2002, the corporation became a public limited liability company known as the National Housing and Construction Company Limited. Later, the Uganda government partially divested from NHCC by selling 49 percent shareholding to the Libyan African Investment Company, an investment company owned by the government of Libya. or is it?

Ownership
As of October 2016, the shareholding in the stock of NHCC was as depicted in the table below:

In August 2016, Patrick Ocailap, an official in the Ugandan Ministry of Finance, Planning and Economic Development, indicated that NHCC did not have sufficient funds to meet its obligations. New investors are needed to inject new funds to increase the company's working capital. In October 2016, the government of Uganda announced its intention to acquire 100 percent shareholding in the company.

Asset base
In 2011, NHCC owned assets in excess of US$70 million, with annual turnover of US$6 million. NHCC owned 5.0% of Housing Finance Bank, Uganda's 9th largest commercial bank, as of December 2013.

Projects as of 2022
As of 2022 which were ready by october 2016, the following were some of the construction and management projects that NHCC was involved in: (1) Impala Housing Estate, Namungoona, Kampala. This is the fourth phase of the Namungoona development, bring the number of planned and completed housing units to 469. (2) Bukerere Housing Estate. A section of this development will consist of  three storey flats (condominiums) intended for upper middle class clients. (3) Jasmine Apartments: Three Bedrooms. (4) Rwizi View Estate: 2 Bedrooms. (5) Rwizi View Estate: 3 Bedrooms.

Recent developments
In July 2014, NHCC borrowed US$9 million from Shelter Afrique, a Nairobi-based pan-African finance institution, for the purpose of constructing more affordable housing in Uganda.

NHCC owns the twin towers known as Crested Towers in Nakasero, currently housing the headquarters of Stanbic Bank Uganda Limited and the headquarters of the European Union in Uganda, among other tenants. According to the CEO of NHCC, as of June 2016, the buildings were valued in excess of USh80 billion (approx. US$23.5 million). The rent derived from this development is worth USh13 billion (approx. US$3.82 million) every year, according to the CEO.

See also
Housing Finance Bank
NSSF Uganda
Uganda Telecom

References

External links
 NHCC Homepage

Construction and civil engineering companies established in 1964
Government-owned companies of Uganda
Kampala District
1964 establishments in Uganda
Construction and civil engineering companies of Uganda
Housing associations